Agononida sphecia is a species of squat lobster in the family Munididae. The species name is derived from the Greek sphex, meaning "wasp," which refers to the yellow and purple bands on its carapace.

References

Squat lobsters
Crustaceans described in 1994